Beirut Rock Festival is a rock/metal concert in Lebanon.

Beirut Rock Festival 2009 
The first Beirut Rock Festival took place in Forum de Beirut (Karantina) on 11, 13 and 14 November 2009.

Beirut Rock Festival 2011 
The second Beirut Rock Festival took place in the Zouk Mikael Amphitheater (Zouk Mikael) on 2 and 3 September 2011.

Beirut Rock Festival 2013 
The 2013 Beirut Rock Festival took place at Beirut Waterfront on 2 July.

References
 Official Beirut Rock Festival Website
 Lebanese Metal Portal
 LebMetal: The Lebanese Metal Community

External links
 Official Beirut Rock Festival Website

Music festivals in Lebanon
Rock festivals in Lebanon
Autumn events in Lebanon